Major-General Hurdis Secundus Lalande Ravenshaw CMG (June 1869 – c. 6 June 1920) was a senior British Army officer in the First World War who served at the Royal Military College, Sandhurst and saw action on the North-West Frontier of India, in South Africa in the Second Boer War and in France and Greece in the First World War. In 1916 a German U-boat captured him, and he was a prisoner of war for the next two years. He died in 1920 in unusual circumstances after becoming lost in the South African bush near Port Elizabeth and succumbing to the elements.

Military career
Hurdis Ravenshaw was born in June 1869 to John Hurdis Ravenshaw and his second wife Harriet Lalande Biggs. His elder half-brother was Thomas Edward Ravenshaw. He was educated at Haileybury and Imperial Service College and from there joined the militia, using this posting to gain a commission in the East Yorkshire Regiment in December 1888. Seeking action, in August 1890 he transferred to the Devonshire Regiment who were sent to India and went on campaign in 1895 as part of the Chitral Relief Force which overthrew the Mehtar of Chitral and replaced him with the pro-British Shuja ul-Mulk the younger son of the former ruler, Aman ul-Mulk.

In 1897 and 1898 Ravenshaw was again active, conducting operations against Malakand and then participating in the Tirah Campaign where he was with the army which forced the Khyber Pass against the Afridis. He was appointed adjutant of the 1st battalion of his regiment in December 1898, serving until December 1902. In these years he was transferred with his regiment to South Africa to fight against the Boers at the outbreak of the Second Boer War in late 1899. He fought in the relief of Ladysmith and numerous smaller actions for three years. After his return home in 1902, Ravenshaw was given the position of Adjutant at Sandhurst, a post he held until 1907.

First World War
In 1914, Ravenshaw was brought out of semi-retirement to command the 1st battalion of the Connaught Rangers, an Irish regiment in India which he brought to France for service on the Western Front in late September. Ravenshaw remained in command of the Connaught Rangers until April 1915, when he was made a staff officer at 1st Division headquarters before being promoted and given command of the 83rd Brigade. This unit saw action in France during 1915 before being sent to Salonica in Greece as part of the Mediterranean Expeditionary Force. There he served against the Bulgarian Army, rising to command the 27th Division in October 1916.

In December 1916, Ravenshaw sailed on the troop ship  to meet his superiors in England. On 4 December,  sank Caledonia in the Mediterranean, and captured both Ravenshaw and his adjutant Captain FHD Vickerman. They were taken to Austria-Hungary, where they were prisoners of war for the next two years.

Released after the armistice, Ravenshaw was appointed commander of the troops in South Africa. In 1920 he travelled to Port Elizabeth in South Africa and on 6 June was seen entering Addo Bush near the city but failed to return. A search party discovered his body two days later.

Notes

References

 

1869 births
1920 deaths
People educated at Haileybury and Imperial Service College
East Yorkshire Regiment officers
Devonshire Regiment officers
Connaught Rangers officers
British military personnel of the Malakand Frontier War
British military personnel of the Chitral Expedition
British military personnel of the Tirah campaign
British Army personnel of the Second Boer War
British Army generals of World War I
World War I prisoners of war held by Austria-Hungary
Companions of the Order of St Michael and St George
British World War I prisoners of war